Nordlien Church or Nordlia Church ( or ) is a parish church of the Church of Norway in Østre Toten Municipality in Innlandet county, Norway. It is located in the village of Nordlia. It is the church for the Nordlien parish which is part of the Toten prosti (deanery) in the Diocese of Hamar. The white, wooden church was built in a long church design in 1901 using plans drawn up by the architect Johan Meyer. The church seats about 232 people.

History
Planning for a new church at Nordlia began around the turn of the 20th century. Johan Meyer was hired to design the new wooden building. It is a long church with an asymmetrically placed tower on the northeast side of the nave. The nave is rectangular and the chancel is narrower than the nave. There is a church porch on the west end that is the same width as the nave. There is also a sacristy on the east side of the tower and north of the chancel. The building was originally constructed as an annex chapel when it was consecrated in 1901. More recently, it was upgraded in status to that of a parish church.

Media gallery

See also
List of churches in Hamar

References

Østre Toten
Churches in Innlandet
Churches in Toten Deanery
Long churches in Norway
Wooden churches in Norway
20th-century Church of Norway church buildings
Churches completed in 1901
1901 establishments in Norway